The Public Schools Act 1868 was enacted by the British Parliament to reform and regulate seven leading English boys' boarding schools, most of which had grown out of ancient charity schools for the education of a certain number of poor scholars, but were by then, as they are today, also educating many sons of the English upper and upper-middle classes on a fee-paying basis. The preamble describes "An Act to make further Provision for the good Government and Extension of certain Public Schools in England."
The concept of a public school therefore predates this Act.

The Act followed the report of the Clarendon Commission, a Royal Commission set up to inquire into nine leading schools, which sat from 1861 to 1864 and investigated conditions and abuses which had grown up over the centuries at these originally charity schools.

The bill was presented for its first reading in the Lords by Lord Clarendon on 13 March 1865 and for its second reading on 3 April 1865. The bill was in two parts, the first containing the general provisions of the bill and the second containing specific proposals for each school.

St Paul's School and Merchant Taylors' School were omitted, as they argued successfully that their constitutions made them legally "private" schools and that their constitutions could not be altered by public legislation; thus the act concerned itself with the other seven schools investigated by the Clarendon Commission:

 Charterhouse School
 Eton College
 Harrow School
 Rugby School
 Shrewsbury School
 Westminster School
 Winchester College

The act regulated these seven schools in a number of ways, as recommended by the Clarendon Commission, with the aim of creating better conditions in them and preventing abuses, and authorized the establishment of a board of governors for each school, to supervise their administration. It also freed them of their obligations under their founding charters to educate "Foundation Scholars", i.e. scholarship boys paying nominal or no fees. The Act made it clear that parliament had authority to legislate for the schools. The act led to development of the schools away from the traditional exclusively classics-based curriculum taught by clergymen, to a somewhat broader scope of studies.

In 1887 the Divisional Court and the Court of Appeal determined that the City of London School was a public school.

References

Bibliography

External links
Text of the Public Schools Act 1868, Education in England

United Kingdom Acts of Parliament 1868
United Kingdom Education Acts
1868 in British law
1868 in education
July 1868 events